The economy of Tibet is dominated by subsistence agriculture. Due to limited arable land, livestock raising is the primary occupation mainly on the Tibetan Plateau, among them are sheep, cattle, goats, camels, yaks, donkeys and horses. The main crops grown are barley, wheat, buckwheat, rye, potatoes, oats, rapeseeds, cotton and assorted fruits and vegetables. In recent years the economy has begun evolving into a multiple structure with agriculture and tertiary industry developing side by side.

Growth

From the 1951 Seventeen Point Agreement to 2003, life expectancy in Tibet increased from thirty-six years to sixty-seven years with infant mortality and absolute poverty declining steadily. Professor Lin Chun summarizes, "Roads, factories, schools, hospitals, and above all, modern conceptions of equality and citizenship, however undemocratic they might be, had transformed the land of snows where the cruelty and hardship of an ancient serfdom had been evident."

Tibet's GDP in 2008 was 39.6 billion renminbi yuan. The Chinese government says that it exempts Tibet from all taxation and provides 90% of Tibet's government expenditure. Critics say that the central government in Beijing are stripping Tibetan resources and neglecting the welfare of Tibetan people.

According to the Chairman of the Tibet Autonomous Region, Qiangba Puncog, Tibet's economy has grown on average 12% per year from 2000 to 2006. The per capita GDP reached 10,000 RMB in 2006 for the first time in Tibet's history.

In the first six months of 2008, economic growth in Tibet was halved after the Lhasa riots led to a slump in tourism, consumption and output.  The region’s economy expanded 7.4 percent in the period from 2007, down from 14.7 percent in the year-earlier period.

Chinese development efforts
The Chinese government allocates yearly economic and financial aid packages to the Tibet Autonomous Region, an amount that academic Lin Chun of the London School of Economics and Political Science characterizes as "enormous." China's most recent Five Year Plan includes nearly USD $30 billion in Tibetan transportation infrastructure funding. 

From January 18–20, 2010 a national conference on Tibet and areas inhabited by Tibetans in Sichuan, Yunnan, Gansu and Qinghai was held in China and a substantial plan to improve development of the areas was announced. The conference was attended by CPC Politburo Standing Committee members: Hu Jintao, Wu Bangguo, Wen Jiabao, Jia Qinglin, Li Changchun, Xi Jinping, Li Keqiang, He Guoqiang and Zhou Yongkang signaling the commitment of senior Chinese leaders to development of Tibet and ethnic Tibetan areas. The plan calls for improvement of rural Tibetan income to national standards by 2020 and free education for all rural Tibetan children. The Chinese government has invested 310 billion yuan (about 45.6 billion U.S. dollars) in Tibet since 2001. "Tibet's GDP was expected to reach 43.7 billion yuan in 2009, up 170 percent from that in 2000 and posting an annual growth of 12.3 percent over the past nine years." Outside observers credited increased interest in Tibet to concern over Tibetan nationalism which resulted in ethnic unrest in 2008.

Industry 
Many factories have been established in the Tibet Autonomous Region since 1959, but industrial development has had a long and prosperous history. The government initially tried to follow the industrial structure and development plans of other regions, while ignoring the actual situation in the TAR (scarcity of fuel, high transport costs, inexperienced local labour, etc.). There was no modern industry or infrastructure before the 1950s and people's life-styles and work habits were very different from those of industrial societies. Many plants rapidly became financially unprofitable and a drain on the government. The value of industrial output of state enterprises first rose to 141.7 million yuan in 1960, and fell to 11.2 million yuan in 1968.

With some adjustments, the value of industrial output rose again in the late 1980s. Moreover, as in the rest of China, the ownership structure of industrial enterprises in the TAR also experienced a major change. In 2007, for a “gross industrial output value” totaling 5,044 million yuan, 33,1% came from state enterprises, 5.6% from collectively-owned enterprises and 61.3% from "others" (private companies, joint ventures and foreign companies). Thus, private enterprise is now the main source of growth in industrial production.

According to the White Paper published by the central government in 2009 to mark the Fiftieth Anniversary of the "Democratic Reform in Tibet," a modern Tibetan industry has developed with mining, construction materials, handicrafts and Tibetan medicine as pillar industries, and power generation, processing of agricultural products and livestock and food production as auxiliary. The industrial added value rose by 15 million yuan in 1959 to 2,968,000,000 yuan in 2008. Modern commerce, tourism, catering, leisure and other industries that had never been heard of in old Tibet, are now booming as the primary industries in the region. Petroleum, natural gas, and rubber also play a large role in Tibet's annual exports.

Traditional handicrafts

The rapid economic development of the T.A.R. has brought about a revival of traditional handicrafts. Many Tibetans today draw a significant part of their income from selling handicraft and cultural products to tourists, or even to other Tibetans.

Founded in 1953, the state carpet-making factory in Lhasa has turned into a modern enterprise whose products are sold in Europe, North America and South Asia.

Tourism
In recent years Tibet's tourism has expanded rapidly, especially after the completion of Qingzang Railway in July 2006. Tibet received 2.5 million tourists in 2006, including 150,000 foreigners.

In 2007, the figure climbed to some 4 million visitors but fell to only 2,246,400 in 2008 
on account of the region being closed to tourism from March till June.
 
Between January and July 2009, more than 2.7 million tourists visited the TAR, three times as many as for the same period in 2008, generating an income of 2.29 billion yuans.

In 2010, the region received 6.85 million tourists from home and abroad, generating revenues of 7.14 billion yuan, 14 percent of its total GDP.

Between January 1 and November 30, 2012, the T.A.R. received a record 10 million domestic and foreign tourists, as against more than 8.69 million visitors in 2011. Nearly 300,000 people are employed in the region's tourism sector, according to government figures.

Agriculture

Agricultural pests
Plutella xylostella is a pest almost everywhere cruciferous vegetables are grown, including the Plateau. The various weedy forms of Cannabis which have now spread worldwide originated on the northeast edge of the Plateau, in Tibet and Qinghai. Tibetan populations of Locusta migratoria show adaptations which allow them to respond better to hypoxia. Overall Tibet has been invaded by fewer agricultural insect threats, mostly because of its lack of sea access. Coastal economic expansion has allowed for invasions to occur, but as Tibet also begins to grow economically, it too may suffer the same fate.

References

External links and sources

"Tourism, government spending boost Tibet’s living standard": Canadian columnist
Guidelines For International Development Projects And Sustainable Investment In Tibet (site Tibet.com)
Impoverishing Tibetans (2000, site of TCHRD)
npr.org
infoplease.com
english.people.com.cn
china.org
english.people.com.cn
case.edu
For details on the nature of economic development and the economic causes of unrest in Tibet, see Ben Hillman, "Rethinking China's Tibet Policy," Japan Focus